Roberto Sánchez Ramírez (born 18 July 1910 in Teocaltiche, Jalisco - date of death unknown) was a Mexican hurdler who competed in the 1932 Summer Olympics.

References

1910 births
Year of death missing
Mexican male hurdlers
People from Teocaltiche
Sportspeople from Jalisco
Olympic athletes of Mexico
Athletes (track and field) at the 1932 Summer Olympics
Central American and Caribbean Games gold medalists for Mexico
Central American and Caribbean Games bronze medalists for Mexico
Competitors at the 1935 Central American and Caribbean Games
Competitors at the 1938 Central American and Caribbean Games
Central American and Caribbean Games medalists in athletics
20th-century Mexican people